Kavalköy is a village in the central district of Hakkâri Province in Turkey. The village is populated by Kurds of the Ertoşî tribe and had a population of 148 in 2022.

The hamlets of Çelebî, Esenler, Kasır and Yazlık are attached to Kavalköy.

Population 
Population history from 2007 to 2022:

References 

Villages in Hakkâri District
Kurdish settlements in Hakkâri Province